Ercilla may refer to:

 Ercilla, Chile, a commune of Chile's Araucanía region
 Ercilla (magazine), a bi-weekly Chilean news magazine
 Ercilla (plant), a genus of flowering plants in the Phytolaccaceae family
 3114 Ercilla, a main belt asteroid
 Alonso de Ercilla (1533–1594), a Spanish nobleman, soldier, epic poet, and author of La Araucana